Student Bodies is a television sitcom that was produced in Montreal from 1997 to the end of 1999. While a live-action series, animations are used throughout as thoughts and imaginations. The segments are comical, bizarre and sometimes dark.

Though the show enjoyed much bigger success in Canada, the show was originally made for the American market under the distribution of 20th Television and aired on many Fox affiliated stations during the 1997-1998 and 1998–1999 seasons. The show aired in Canada on Global and YTV. It has been called "an imitation of Saved by the Bell" by critics, and featured an ensemble cast of high school students at Thomas A. Edison High School. As of 2018, the show aired in reruns on ABC Spark.

Characters
Cody Anthony Miller (Jamie Elman), the protagonist of the show, was the cartoonist for the high school newspaper publication of the same name as the show, which rivaled the official school paper led by Victor Kane (Miklos Perlus). In the first season, Cody had an ongoing rivalry with Victor, the weaselly editor of the Student Voice, but they became friends after the staff of the "Student Voice" joined "Student Bodies".

The audience regularly saw his thoughts on the show's current situation in the form of his cartoons, a technique that has been used on other shows such as Lizzie McGuire. His cartoons were also often used as scene and location transitions, as a continuation of the current live scene, and in the opening and closing sequences. Another main source of Cody's cartoon drawings were his relationships with his girlfriends throughout the series, who included "Student Bodies" editor Emily Roberts (Nicole Lyn) and fellow member Grace Vasquez (Victoria Sanchez), and other characters including "transition" girlfriend Holly Benson (Katheryn Winnick) and Kim McCloud (Jennifer Finnigan), who became a main character in the third season.

Others in the cast included Erin Simms, who played Morgan McKnight in the first season and was the object of Chris Sheppard's (Ross Hull) infatuation, before he and Margaret "Mags" Abernathy (Katie Emme McIninch) became a couple on the show. Jessica Goldapple played Francesca "Flash" Albright, the photographer loyal to Victor Kane (Miklos Perlus) and Mark Taylor played Romeo Carter, who became Emily's boyfriend after Cody and Emily broke up. Romeo and Emily break up near the end of the show's final season. Staff at Edison High included vice-principal Mrs. Morton, played by Michelle Sweeney.

Trivia
The show was produced in Montreal and was broadcast in English; there was a French translation (made in France) called Vice-Versa, and aired on Canal Famille in Quebec.
The show's opening theme song (as well as the opening credits sequence) changed after the first season's, to a pop rock-style theme song. This new theme song remained until the end of the series.
The show was shot in an abandoned high school in Montreal, which was used as a studio.
Co-creator Alan Silberberg designed the animated segments.

Cast
Jamie Elman as Cody Anthony Miller
Miklos Perlus as Victor Kane
Nicole Lyn as Emily Roberts
Ross Hull as Chris Sheppard
Katie Emme McIninch as Margaret 'Mags' Abernathy
Jessica Goldapple as Francesca 'Flash' Albright 
Mark Taylor as Romeo Carter
Erin Simms as Morgan McKnight (Season 1)
Victoria Sanchez as Grace Vasquez (Season 1–2)
Jennifer Finnigan as Kim McCloud (Season 3)
Michelle Sweeney as Mrs. Morton (Recurring)

Episode guide

Season 1 (1997–1998)
1.       Disco Cody
2.       Monsieur Cody
3.       The Bully
4.       Date With Morgan
5.       All Hallow's Eve
6.       Scheming Victor
7.       Mags' Dark Side
8.       Cody For President
9.       Tutor's Pet
10.      The Holiday Show
11.      Time Capsule
12.      Mags' Birthday
13.      Cyrano De Edison
14.      Goop
15.      Victor In Love
16.      Valentine's Day
17.      Date-A-Rama
18.      Secret Admirer
19.      Mags' Rags
20.      Career Day
21.      Secret Weapon
22.      Flash
23.      Cody Presley
24.      Bad Girl Emily
25.      Grounded For Life
26.      Tanya

Season 2 (1998–1999)
27.     The Trial
28.     A New Beginning
29.     The Waitress
30.     The Road Trip
31.     Cody Moves In
32.     Dating Game
33.     A Perfect Mags
34.     The Boys of Edison
35.     Permission
36.     Boss Cody
37.     New Year's Eve
38.     The Holdup
39.     The Game Show
40.     The Teacher
41.     Snowed In
42.     Babe Magnet
43.     Victor Moves In
44.     Double Date
45.     Goodbye Grace
46.     The Test
47.     Detention
48.     Cheer Up, Cody
49.     The T-shirt
50.     Gay Friend

Season 3 (1999-2000)
51.    New Friends (aka New Guys)
52.    Stand-Up Chris
53.    The Junior Prom
54.    The Blow-Up
55.    Dead Men Don't Go To Edison (aka Dead Men Don't Wear Plaid)
56.    Kiss and Tell
57.    After High School
58.    Romeo Hurts His Knee (aka Romeo's Wounded Knee)
59.    Time to Try
60.    Victor Gets Drunk
61.    Chris' Death
62.    Romeo's Old Friend
63.    The Break-Up
64.    The Reunion
65.    The Triangle

International broadcast
In Israel, the show was broadcast on Arutz HaYeladim.

In the Dominican Republic, it was broadcast on Telesistema 11, as part of their Saturday morning block.

References

External links

 
 YTV.com

1990s American teen sitcoms
2000s American teen sitcoms
1990s American high school television series
2000s American high school television series
1997 American television series debuts
2000 American television series endings
1990s Canadian teen sitcoms
2000s Canadian teen sitcoms
1990s Canadian high school television series
2000s Canadian high school television series
1997 Canadian television series debuts
2000 Canadian television series endings
American television series with live action and animation
Canadian television series with live action and animation
Television series about teenagers
Television shows filmed in Montreal
Television series by Corus Entertainment
Television series by Sunbow Entertainment
Television series by 20th Century Fox Television
English-language television shows
YTV (Canadian TV channel) original programming